Giorgio Pantano (born 4 February 1979) is an Italian professional racing driver who drove for the Jordan Formula One team for much of the 2004 season before being replaced by Timo Glock. He also raced in Formula 3000. He retired from racing at the end of 2014.

He raced in the GP2 Series from its inaugural year in 2005 until his championship campaign in 2008, holding the record for most races competed and most races won in the series. As of 2011, these records have been taken over by Luca Filippi (86 starts) and Pastor Maldonado (10 wins) respectively.

Career

Early years
Born in Padua, Pantano is the holder of one of the best records ever in karting, where he started at age nine. Nico Rosberg grew up with a poster of Pantano on his bedroom wall and later would describe the Italian as being "probably the best of all time in karts." Fernando Alonso once called Pantano "invincible" and that in karting he had looked up to him as being "a really incredible talent."

In his first year in Cadet karting he achieved the Italian and European titles. In 1994 he won the Italian and World titles in Junior karting and in 1995 and 1996 won the European Formula A title. In 1996 he was signed by AMG-Mercedes, from where he went through a difficult patch to enter Formula One racing. He entered the winter series of Palmer Audi in 1999 and tested for the Astromega Formula 3000 team before signing for the KMS team that would take him to race in Formula Three in his first year of single-seater racing. He won his first race and went on to win the title.

F3000
His first taste of Formula One came in 2000, when he was tested by Benetton. However, he joined Astromega in Formula 3000 in 2001 and won at Monza. That same year he tested for McLaren. In 2002 he tested for Williams and Minardi, but was unable to break into Formula One, so he signed for the Durango team and won two races in the International Formula 3000 series in 2003, which earned him third place in the championship. He nearly spent 2003 in Champ Car, but the BC Motorsports team with whom he believed he had a contract proved to be fake.

Formula One
Pantano had been all set to make his Formula One debut for Jaguar, however two days before he was due to sign with the squad they concluded a deal with Christian Klien, who was able to bring $10 million of funding from Red Bull. The Italian instead signed for the Jordan Formula One team in early 2004, and after minimal testing his season proved troublesome. He finished last in his first race in Australia, while his more experienced teammate Nick Heidfeld, retired with a transmission problem. He continued racing, never managing to qualify or finish any higher than around the back of the field, and retiring on several occasions, failing to grab much attention. He was replaced for a one-off by German debutant Timo Glock (due to financial reasons) at the Canadian Grand Prix, who scored two points finishing seventh, ahead of teammate Nick Heidfeld who was eighth. Pantano returned to his seat in the team for the next race in United States, but went out at the first corner after colliding with other drivers. He continued with more disappointing results until the Italian Grand Prix at Monza, after which he was replaced by Timo Glock for the remaining three races of the season. Pantano later divulged that it had been his own choice to stop racing with Jordan due to the financial burden placed on his family and his own feelings that the team was favouring his teammate Heidfeld over him.

GP2 and IndyCar
After his unsuccessful season in Formula One, he left the series. In 2005 he raced in the inaugural GP2 Series season for the SuperNova team, alongside Adam Carroll of Northern Ireland, who defied expectations by outpacing Pantano. He also drove in the Indy Racing League for Chip Ganassi Racing in the two road-course races in the 2005 season. The team scaled back to two cars for 2006, signing champion Dan Wheldon alongside Scott Dixon. Pantano had several off-season Champ Car tests for PKV Racing and Mi-Jack Conquest Racing but they failed to result in a ride for the season and Pantano sat out most of the early part of the new season before finding a new lease of life in Giancarlo Fisichella's GP2 team FMS. After a crash on his first time back, Pantano impressed in the car, his experience gaining him solid points-scoring finishes in the second half of the season, including three wins. He raced for ex-Formula One driver Adrián Campos's team in 2007. On 30 June he claimed the team's maiden victory in the series, winning a chaotic feature race in Magny-Cours.

For the 2008 season he signed to partner Spaniard Javier Villa at the Racing Engineering team. Pantano started the season well, taking fourth and third positions in the Catalunya feature and sprint races respectively. Things were even better in the Istanbul Park feature race, for which he took pole and won the race. After a measured drive to fourth in the sprint race Pantano led the championship, but lost the lead to Bruno Senna following two retirements in Monaco. However he retook the lead following a win at the Magny-Cours feature race, in which Senna retired. Despite retirement in the sprint race Pantano left Magny-Cours with the championship lead. Following further feature race wins in both Silverstone and Hockenheimring Pantano increased his championship lead over Senna.

A bad weekend in Hungaroring dented his advantage but he bounced back with pole for the feature race at the new Valencia. Having led the whole race in dominant style Pantano faced the heartbreak of running out of fuel on the last lap, handing victory to Vitaly Petrov. However, Senna also ran out of fuel, and thus Pantano's lead was undamaged. With Senna retiring again in the sprint race, where Pantano finished third, the Italian held a 13-point lead in the series with two rounds remaining. At Spa-Francorchamps he qualified fourth, before a mechanical problem under the safety car dropped him down the order. Attempting to fight back, he spun at La Source with two laps to go, before running into Lucas di Grassi at the same corner on the final lap, causing him to be disqualified. At Monza, he took the GP2 crown, in spite of finishing 10th. His nearest rival Bruno Senna only finished fifth, thus handing Pantano the crown.

At the Silverstone race, Pantano became the most successful driver of all time in the F1 feeder championships (F2 / F3000 / GP2). His win in the Saturday race gave him a cumulative F3000/GP2 win tally of 14, taking him above the 13 F2/F3000 championship wins of Mike Thackwell and 12 European championship Formula Two wins of Jochen Rindt. (If non-championship wins are included, Rindt and other drivers exceed this total). Pantano's Silverstone win was his eighth in the GP2 Series, making him also the most successful driver in GP2 history.

Superleague Formula
Unable to find a drive in Formula One and unable to return to GP2 as former champions are not permitted, Pantano joined up with Superleague Formula to drive the A.C. Milan entry. Pantano won one race for A.C. Milan at the Magny-Cours round.

After 2010

Pantano was linked to a return to the IndyCar Series in 2010, driving a Panther Racing entry. He instead signed on to drive in Auto GP for Super Nova Racing, finishing 13th in the championship.

Pantano returned to the IndyCar Series in 2011 as an injury replacement for Justin Wilson in races at Sonoma and Baltimore, and did not consider to racing again in Europe in the near future.

Pantano made a brief return to IndyCar in 2012, racing at the 2012 Honda Indy 200 at Mid-Ohio for Chip Ganassi Racing. He finished 14th after qualifying in 24th place. In 2013 Pantano competed in the International GT Open GTS class and won the championship with three wins and five podium finishes in 13 races. He subsequently switched to the Blancpain Sprint Series for 2014, sharing a Bhaitech-run McLaren MP4-12C with Fabio Onidi, with a view to pursuing a career as a sportscar racer. He also secured a drive at the 2014 Spa 24 Hours for Thierry Boutsen's Boutsen Ginion team, sharing a McLaren with Frédéric Vervisch, Olivier Grotz and Karim Ojjeh.

Racing record

Career summary

Complete International Formula 3000 results
(key) (Races in bold indicate pole position; races in italics indicate fastest lap.)

Complete Formula One results
(key)

Complete GP2 Series results
(key) (Races in bold indicate pole position) (Races in italics indicate fastest lap)

IndyCar Series
(key) (Races in bold indicate pole position)

Superleague Formula

Super Final Results

Complete Auto GP Results
(key) (Races in bold indicate pole position) (Races in italics indicate fastest lap)

Complete Blancpain Sprint Series results

References

External links

 
 
 Giorgio Pantano at Driver Database

1979 births
Living people
Sportspeople from the Province of Padua
Italian racing drivers
Italian Formula One drivers
Jordan Formula One drivers
IndyCar Series drivers
International Formula 3000 drivers
GP2 Series drivers
GP2 Series Champions
Auto GP drivers
German Formula Three Championship drivers
Formula Palmer Audi drivers
Karting World Championship drivers
Eurocup Mégane Trophy drivers
International GT Open drivers
Blancpain Endurance Series drivers
24 Hours of Spa drivers
Superleague Formula drivers
Super Nova Racing drivers
Scuderia Coloni drivers
Campos Racing drivers
Racing Engineering drivers
Chip Ganassi Racing drivers
Dreyer & Reinbold Racing drivers
Team Astromega drivers
Durango drivers
Euronova Racing drivers
Ombra Racing drivers
Bhaitech drivers
Prema Powerteam drivers
British Formula Three Championship drivers
Boutsen Ginion Racing drivers